Jernaya is a municipality located in South Lebanon, on the border between the districts of Jezzine and Nabatiyeh. Its inhabitants are primarily Maronite Catholics.

Etymology 

The name "Jernaya" is a Syriac phrase directly translated as "from the gurnaye". Gurnaye is the plural of gurna: the bark, mortar, and plunge pits in rock.. Its demonym(), transliterated as Jernaoui.

Geography 

Jernaya is located 17 km from Saida, and 57 km from Beirut. It is administratively part of the caza (Arabic: qada) of Jezzine. It is separated by a valley to the South from the governorate of Nabatiye. It has a surface area of 231 hectares.

Jernaya is completely surrounded by Muslim Shia villages, except for the Maronite town of Kfar Chelal. It borders the villages of Kfar Beit, Kfar Melki, and Kfar Fila.

Being 460 m above sea level, Jernaya has a mild Mediterranean mountainous climate (slightly cooler than Saida). On rare occasions, snowfall can occur between the months of December to February, however it usually melts within 24 hours.

Demographics 

Jernaya's inhabitants are almost exclusively Maronite Catholics, with a Greek Catholic minority. Most villagers only live in Jernaya during the summer, and have jobs in neighboring Saida or Beirut.

As the Lebanese government has not conducted a census since 1932, there is no official data on the population of any Lebanese city. According to the 2017 electoral roll (which only include people aged 21+), there are 1,390 voters:

 1,358 Maronite Catholics
 32 Greek Catholics

Government 

Jernaya is a municipality as defined by the Lebanese Ministry of Interior and Municipalities. The government consists of a mukhtar and a municipal council made up of 12 members. Following the 2016 municipal elections, its members are: Jean Aboud (president), Joe Antoun, Johnny Khoury, Joseph Azar, Elias Abi-Nahm, Jean Smaan, Charbel Hayek, Jean Saouaya, Nemr Hayek, Claude Hayek, George Jabbour, and Marie Najm.

Following a petition by the citizens of Jernaya, the Ministry of Agriculture published a decree stating that goats and livestock from neighboring villages are forbidden from entering the territory of the municipality (decree No. 11 on 14 March 1996).

There are two voter circumscriptions in Jernaya: Public School Room No. 1 and Public School Room No. 2. They have 640 and 618 members on their electoral rolls, respectively.

2016 municipal election 

Two competing lists, each made up of 12 candidates, ran for the 12 seats of the municipal council. All members of List 1 were elected.

 List 1's leader: Jean Abboud (475 votes)
 List 2's leader: Fady Hayek (231 votes)

Attractions 

Jernaya has a full-size basketball court on the Southeastern side (directly below the cemetery), and a community recreation center located on the ground floor of the municipality located downtown. There are two churches: Notre-Dame-de-Sainte-Marie (Our Lady of Saint Mary) and St. Elie chapel. The cathedral Notre-Dame-de-Jernaya (Our Lady of Jernaya) is currently under construction on the Eastern side of the village.

The hotel Erzel-Jernaya is located in the lush valley on the southern border of the village. The valley, which separates the Nabatiye and South-Lebanon governorates with a river running through its trough, is completely vegetated as construction is forbidden to preserve its character. It is an ideal spot for hunting, hiking, and camping.

The municipal cemetery (of Maronite confession) is located on the Eastern side of Jernaya. It contains a crypt for the deceased, numerous tomb vaults, and the mausoleum of General Elie Hayek. Saint-Elie chapel is located directly at the entrance of the cemetery.

A swimming pool and tennis court complex is currently being built at the municipality's eastern border.

References

External links
Jernaya, Localiban

Populated places in Jezzine District
Maronite Christian communities in Lebanon